Markham's storm petrel (Hydrobates markhami) is a species of storm petrel in the family Hydrobatidae. An all-black to sooty brown seabird, Markham's storm petrel is difficult to differentiate from the black petrel Procellaria parkinsoni in life, and was once described as conspecific with, or biologically identical to, Tristram's storm petrel Hydrobates tristrami. Markham's storm petrel inhabits open seas in the Pacific Ocean around Peru, Chile, and Ecuador, but only nests in northern Chile and Peru, with ninety-five percent of all known breeding populations in 2019 found in the Atacama Desert. First described by British ornithologist Osbert Salvin in 1883, the bird was named in honor of Albert Hastings Markham, a naval officer who collected a specimen off Peru. 

Markham's storm petrel nests in natural cavities in saltpeter, and pairs produce one egg per season. After hatching, fledglings make their way to sea, and can be either attracted to or disoriented by artificial lights. The diet of Markham's storm petrel consists of fish, cephalopods, and crustaceans, with about ten percent of stomach contents traceable to scavenging according to a 2002 study. Since at least 2012, Markham's storm petrel has been listed as an endangered species in Chile, and, in 2019, the International Union for Conservation of Nature (IUCN) classified the conservation status of Markham's storm petrel as Near Threatened due to habitat loss on its nesting grounds. The  (SAG), a department of the Ministry of Agriculture of Chile, has undertaken conservation efforts in the country.

Taxonomy
The northern storm petrel family, Hydrobatidae, is a group of seabirds characterized by long legs and a high adaption to marine environments, with its eighteen species predominately endemic to the northern hemisphere. In Hydrobatidae, Markham's storm petrel is a member of the genus Hydrobates, the only genus in the family, and is large compared to other members in the genus. Hydrobatidae probably diverged from other petrels at an early stage; according to John Warham, the petrel group had "substantial radiation" by the Miocene. Storm petrel fossils are rare; those which are found date from the Upper Miocene in California.

British ornithologist Osbert Salvin first described Markham's storm petrel as Cymochorea markhami in 1883. Markham's storm petrel is named after Sir Albert Hastings Markham, a British explorer and naval officer who picked up the type specimen off Peru. The bird was thought by ornithologist James L. Peters in 1931 as conspecific, or biologically identical, with Tristram's storm petrel Oceanodroma tristrami, though the two species were later distinguished by  size. Similarly, ornithologist Reginald Wagstaffe considered Tristram's storm petrel a subspecies of Markham's storm petrel in 1972, though subsequent research recognized them as different species. In 2016, the International Union for Conservation of Nature (IUCN) reclassified Oceanodroma markhami as Hydrobates markhami based on HBW and BirdLife International Illustrated Checklist of the Birds of the World, volume 1, by Josep del Hoyo and British ornithologist Nigel J. Collar. In some studies, the genus Oceanodroma  was found to be paraphyletic with respect to Hydrobates, and all former Oceanodroma species were transferred to Hydrobates under some authorities. In 2021, all species in Oceanodroma were transferred to Hydrobates by the International Ornithologists' Union. Its name in Spanish is Golondrina de mar negra or paíño ahumado.

Description
Markham's storm petrel is an all-black to sooty brown storm petrel with a dull lead-gray gloss on its head, neck and mantle in fresh plumage. Its underside, from the neck down, and wing lining are blackish brown, and become almost fuscous, or brownish-gray, with wear of the plumage. External edges of wing coverts in the bird become whitish with wear, but are normally brown; the whitening produces a broad grayish bar that generally extends closer to the wing's bend than what American ornithologist Robert Cushman Murphy observed as a somewhat similar mark in the black petrel Loomelania melania (Procellaria parkinsoni). Markham's storm petrel's iris is brown, its bill and feet are black, and its tail is deeply forked. Murphy described the species as difficult to distinguish in life from the black petrel, with the chief difference being a much shorter tarsus.

Sexes are alike in terms of physical description, and according to Drucker and Jaramillo of Birds of the World, there are "no known morphological differences between adults and juveniles", even in hand. Markham's storm petrel's eggs are described as pure white without gloss. Molting adults are seen in the southern spring and early summer, molting juveniles several months earlier.

Ornithologists Larry B. Spear and David G. Ainley report that Markham's storm petrel has a more leisurely flight pattern than that of the black petrel, and state that Markham's storm petrel has a similar flight pattern to Leach's storm petrel. In 1980, Canadian author RGB Brown stated the birds tended to glide over two observations, with shallow and rapid wingbeats, though an observation by American ornithologist Rollo Beck described its wingbeats as slow, and slower than the wingbeats of Wilson's storm petrel Oceanites oceanicus and Elliot's storm petrel Oceanites gracilis. Unlike the black petrel, Markham's storm petrel typically flies greater than one meter over the ocean surface.

Distribution and habitat
Markham's storm petrel inhabits waters in the Pacific Ocean around Ecuador, Peru, and Chile, though sightings have occurred on the equator west of the Galápagos Islands, within the Panama Bight, and off of Baja California. Sightings off of Baja California might mistake Markham's storm petrel for the black storm petrel due to difficulties of distinguishability in the field. Its presence is highly unlikely in the Atlantic Ocean outside of freak vagrancies, and in 2007, Spear and Ainley classified the species as endemic to the Humboldt Current. Despite its range, Markham's storm petrel only nests in Peru and Chile.

A survey conducted by Spear and Ainley from 18°N to 30°S, west to 115°, found greatest densities of the bird during austral autumn (the non-breeding season) offshore between Guayaquil and Lima. Nesting colonies were first reported in the late 1980s to early 1990s. After further exploration in November 2013 based on the recording, in 2019, populations of 34,684 nests in Arica, 20,000 nests in Salar Grande, and 624 nests in Pampa de la Perdiz were found in the Atacama Desert of northern Chile. This translated to about ninety-five percent of the known breeding population at the time.

Behavior and ecology

Markham's storm petrel nests in burrows, natural cavities, and holes in saltpeter crusts. Nests in saltpeter cavities have been reported in Pampa de Camarones in northern Chile, and inland on Paracas Peninsula. In Peru, egg laying occurs from late June to August; in Chile, an analysis of three colonies in the Atacama Desert found a five-month reproductive cycle, from arrival at colonies to departure of fledglings, across all three colonies, though pairs could reproduce asynchronously. This could lead to an overall ten-month reproductive season. Pairs produce one egg per season, and adults in nests were found to vocalize when a conspecific recording of vocalizations was played at the entrance to the nest. The average incubation period in Paracas is 47 days (n = 28). Both the female and male engage in duties related to incubation. The shifts in incubation lasted three days or less in Paracas. According to Birds of the World, there are "[n]o details on the breeding colonies in Chile".

After hatching, in Chile, the fledglings move towards the sea after a chick phase. Fledglings are either attracted to or disoriented by artificial lights, an occurrence common to burrow-nesting petrels.

In a study by Spear, Ainley and William A. Walker of the National Marine Mammal Laboratory, a sample of fifteen Markham's storm petrel had consumed namely the fish Diogenichthys laternatus and Vinciguerria lucetia, among other foods. Markham's storm petrel was found to have a lower dietary diversity than other small petrels, though dietary diversity was high generally among small petrels compared to other birds analyzed. A 2002 study in Marine Ornithology found its main diet by mass consisted of fish (namely the Peruvian anchovy Engraulis ringens), cephalopods (namely the octopus Japetella sp.), and crustaceans (namely the pelagic squat lobster Pleuroncodes monodon), with about ten percent of analyzed stomach contents suggestive of scavenging. Based on large variations in the types of food it consumes, and its tendency to scavenge, biologist Ignacio García-Godos concluded Markham's storm petrel was a forager which opportunistically found food near the surface of the ocean. The proportion of birds that feed or rest, compared to flying in transit, was significantly higher in austral autumn than spring in Spear and Ainley's 2007 study.

In 2018, researchers Patrich Cerpa, Fernando Medrano and Ronny Peredo found the ectoparasite stick-tight flea Hectopsylla psittaci on two birds out of ten captured in Pampa de Chaca within the Arica y Parinacota Region. Both specimens were found in the lorum on each bird. The turkey vulture Cathartes aura served as a possible source for the transition between hosts, as Cerpa, Medrano and Peredo observed the two nesting in the same colony. Researchers Rodrigo Barros et al. described the bird as "one of the least known seabirds in the world".

Threats and conservation
The IUCN estimated the population of Markham's storm petrel in 2019 as between 150,000 and 180,000 individuals, with between 100,000 and 120,000 mature individuals, based on an estimate by researcher Fernando Medrano in 2019. Medrano combined a new colony description with previous findings by Barros in 2019, and estimated the global breeding population at 58,038 pairs. The IUCN estimated the population of Markham's storm petrel was in decline generally based on an estimate by Barros et al., who estimated approximately 21,000 fledglings die each year, though the IUCN noted juvenile seabirds have a higher mortality rate in general based on environmental parameters, age, and sex. The IUCN could not give a specific population trend for mature individuals because tendencies for mature populations were unknown. Prior to 2019, no concrete population estimates for Markham's storm petrel existed, with a 2004 estimate by Brooke placing the population at likely in excess of 30,000 individuals, a 2007 estimate by Spear and Ainley placing the population between 806,500 in austral spring and 1,100,000 in austral autumn, and a 2012 IUCN estimate placing the population at 50,000 overall individuals.

Despite its very large population size, in 2019, the IUCN classified the conservation status of Markham's storm petrel as Near Threatened due to habitat loss on its nesting grounds. Since at least 2012, the bird has been classified as endangered in Chile, and, in 2018, the Chilean  (MMA) classified the bird as En Peligro de Extinción [in danger of extinction] by its Reglamento de Clasificación de Especies. In April 2014, the SAG stated it already rescued a large number of juveniles who lost their way likely due to lighting in cities, a phenomenon that had been evident in the Tarapacá Region for at least ten years prior. 

In 2018, the SAG reported it returned approximately 2,000 juvenile birds to their natural habitat after the birds fell on streets, the birds apparently believing they had already reached the coast. The brochures instructed citizens what to do if they found a grounded Markham's storm petrel. Similarly, in 2015, the Peruvian Servicio Nacional Forestal y de Fauna Silvestre instructed citizens how to transport a fallen Markham's storm petrel if they should find one. In Ecuador, the species is classified as Near Endangered.

Chief threats to Markham's storm petrel in Chile include garbage, roadways across nesting colonies, mining, new construction and development, and artificial lights. In 2013, Juan C. Torres-Mura and Marina L. Lemus of the Unión de Ornitólogos de Chile reported seeing bulldozer trails, dogs and an encampment of road construction workers near nesting areas close to Arica. Other than habitat loss, salt mines in northern Chile may also provide a source of habitat disturbance through artificial lights; a salt mining company in Chile, for instance, reported over a three-month span that 3,300 fledglings had been grounded due to their lights. Fallen birds were reported in Tacna, Peru, in November 2015, the birds having possibly fallen due to artificial lights. In September 2019, the Chilean MMA produced a Recuperación, Conservación y Gestión de Especies [Recovery, Conservation and Management of Species] plan which included Markham's storm petrel, and which sought to evaluate proposals such as updating a light pollution standard to mitigate the effects of artificial lights on the birds and designating a nesting site at Pampa de Chaca as a protected area.

Notes

References

External links

  Markham's storm petrel profile on Red de Observadores de Aves y Vida Silvestre de Chile [Chilean Bird and Wildlife Observer Network]

Markham's storm petrel
Birds of the Pacific Ocean
Western South American coastal birds
Markham's storm petrel
Taxonomy articles created by Polbot
Taxa named by Osbert Salvin